Károly Peyer (9 May 1881 – 25 October 1956) was a Hungarian politician who served as Interior Minister for six days after the end of the Hungarian Soviet Republic in 1919. He was later Minister of Works in the cabinets of István Friedrich and Károly Huszár. He took part in the consolidation policy of István Bethlen in 1921: as the leader of the main opposition party (the Hungarian Social Democratic Party) he compromised with the Prime Minister (the Bethlen-Peyer Pact). Peyer was called "betrayer of the left-wing" by the communists.

In 1947 Peyer was excluded from his party, so he joined to the Hungarian Radical Party, which organised against communist rule. Soon Peyer emigrated to the United States. The next year the People's Tribunal sentenced him to 8 years.

Peyer died of a heart attack on 25 October 1956, while listening to the news of the Hungarian Revolution of 1956, which broke out two days earlier.

References
 Magyar Életrajzi Lexikon

1881 births
1956 deaths
People from Veszprém County
Hungarian people of German descent
Social Democratic Party of Hungary politicians
Hungarian Radical Party politicians
Hungarian Interior Ministers
Members of the Diet of Hungary
Members of the National Assembly of Hungary (1945–1947)
Members of the National Assembly of Hungary (1947–1949)
Hungarian emigrants to the United States